Edward Charles "Ed" Kachur (April 22, 1934 – December 16, 2014) was a Canadian professional ice hockey forward who played 96 games in the National Hockey League for the Chicago Black Hawks.

References

External links
 

1934 births
2014 deaths
Canadian ice hockey forwards
Chicago Blackhawks players
Ice hockey people from Ontario
Providence Reds players
Sault Thunderbirds players
Sportspeople from Thunder Bay